Cleveland Elementary School may refer to:

 Cleveland Elementary School (Spartanburg, South Carolina)
 Cleveland Elementary School (San Diego, California), which was the site of a school shooting in 1979
 Cleveland Elementary School (Stockton, California), which was the site of a school shooting in 1989
 Elementary schools in Cleveland:
 Cleveland, Ohio, public elementary schools, see Cleveland Metropolitan School District
 Cleveland, Mississippi, public elementary schools, see Cleveland School District
 Cleveland County, England, public primary schools, see List of schools in Redcar and Cleveland

See also 
 Cleveland Elementary School shooting (disambiguation)
 Cleveland School (disambiguation)